The following is a list of Sites of Special Scientific Interest in the Tweeddale and Ettrick and Lauderdale Area of Search.  For other areas, see List of SSSIs by Area of Search.

 Airhouse Wood
 Akermoor Loch
 Ashkirk Loch
 Auchencorth Moss
 Avenel Hill and Gorge
 Bemersyde Moss
 Blind Moss
 Catshawhill
 Clarilaw Grasslands
 Colmsliehill Junipers
 Craigdilly
 Craigengar
 Dolphinton - West Linton Fens and Grassland
 Dunhog Moss
 Faldonside Loch
 Gattonside Moss
 Glenkinnon Burn
 Gordon Moss
 Grieston Quarry
 Henderland Bank
 Hermanlaw and Muckra Cleuchs
 Kingside Loch
 Kirkhope Linns
 Lammer Law
 Lindean Reservoir
 Lynslie Burn
 Makerstoun - Corbie Craigs to Trows' Craigs
 Moffat Hills
 Moorfoot Hills
 Mount Bog
 Newhall Glen
 Newtown St Boswells Woods
 North Esk Valley
 Nut Wood
 Plora Wood
 Riskinhope
 River Tweed
 Selkirk Racecourse Moss
 St Mary's Loch
 Thornylee Quarry
 Threepwood Moss
 Tweedsmuir Hills
 Tweedwood - Gateheugh
 Westwater Reservoir
 Whim Bog
 Whitlaw Mosses
 Whitlaw Rig
 Whitmuirhall Loch
 Williamhope
 Windy Gowl/Carlops Dean

 
Tweeddale and Ettrick and Lauderdale